Alan Myatt (born 1957) is a town crier who set two Guinness World Records. As well as being the loudest crier, recording a cry of 112.8 decibels, he also set the Guinness world record for vocal endurance, issuing a one-hundred word proclamation every 15 minutes for a period of 48 hours.

Career 
He is a crier to commerce, industry and heritage, and can be seen at exhibitions, promotions and trade fairs across Europe. He is also a toastmaster, master of ceremonies and themed character actor.

He is the official town crier for the City of Gloucester, for Letchworth Garden City and Hitchin in Hertfordshire, for London's Covent Garden and also for various venues in the capital including the Stables Market in Camden Town.

In July 2015 he crossed the English Channel to France in an attempt to be the first British town crier since 1066 to make an announcement on the French side of the water.

Myatt is a member of the Ancient and Honourable Guild of Town Criers.

References

External links
Alan Myatt - Official Website
Myatt's Profile on LinkedIn
Alan Myatt on the Charm Music Entertainment website

Town criers
Living people
1957 births
People from Gloucester